The Jervis Bay Territory (JBT) is an internal territory of Australia. It was established in 1915 from part of New South Wales (NSW), in order to give the landlocked Australian Capital Territory (ACT) access to the sea.

It was administered by the Department of the Interior (and later by the Department of the Capital Territory) as if it were part of the ACT, although it has always been a separate Commonwealth territory. The perception that it is part of the ACT stems from the fact that under the terms of the Jervis Bay Territory Acceptance Act 1915, the laws of the ACT apply to the Jervis Bay Territory.
In 1989, when the ACT achieved self-government, the Department of the Arts, Sport, the Environment, Tourism and Territories took over responsibility for the JBT's administration; it has since been administered by various Commonwealth departments responsible for territories.

History 
Jervis Bay has a long history of indigenous Australian settlement. 

Booderee, the name of the national park that covers the majority of the Jervis Bay Territory, means 'bay of plenty' or 'plenty of fish' in the local Aboriginal language. The Yuin people have a strong and continuing connection to the Jervis Bay area. It was decided in December 2016 to apply for Native Title, to recognise the long and ongoing connection.

The bay was sighted by Lieutenant James Cook aboard  on 25 April 1770 (two days after Saint George's Day) and he named the southern headland Cape St George.

In August 1791, the bay was entered and named by Lieutenant Richard Bowen aboard the convict transport ship Atlantic of the Third Fleet in honour of Admiral John Jervis, under whom he had served. In November 1791 Master Matthew Weatherhead aboard the  entered the bay to undertake repairs.
Survivors of the Sydney Cove shipwreck in 1797 reached the area by foot, heading to Port Jackson.

Explorer George Bass entered the bay on 10 December 1797. He named Bowen Island.
John Oxley, an English explorer and surveyor, travelled from Sydney by sea to explore the bay in 1819.

During the negotiations that led to Federation, three major agreements were reached regarding proposed federal territories, including (in particular) the capital city of the proposed federation. First, it was decided that a new, purpose-built city, located within the borders of New South Wales (NSW), should become the federal capital. 

Second, to allay fears that such a location would give NSW too much influence on federal politics, it was also agreed that an area including the new city would be exclaved from NSW – to become a small, separate federal territory. Third, it was also considered desirable, at the time, that the responsibilities and powers of the federal government should include direct control of, and jurisdiction over, at least one port and, therefore, an area of coastline. 

Although the site of the capital city was not decided until 1908, most of the proposed sites were relatively long distances from the sea; hence it was also acknowledged (if only implicitly) that the capital and the port would be in separate, non-contiguous areas. In other words, it would have been onerous and unreasonable for NSW to have surrendered a single, contiguous area large enough to accommodate both port and capital. It was decided subsequently that Jervis Bay was the most practical location for a federally-controlled port. Ownership of Crown land in the area was transferred from the New South Wales government to the federal government in 1909 (at the same time that ownership of the site of Canberra and the surrounding area was also relinquished by NSW).

In 1915, jurisdiction over the Jervis Bay Territory was also transferred from NSW to the Commonwealth. To reduce the practical difficulties presented by the physical separation of the two territories,  although this was never implemented.

The remaining land in the JBT is managed by the Department of Infrastructure, Regional Development and Cities. There is an Aboriginal community at Wreck Bay Village in Booderee National Park. That Council not only holds the majority of land in the Territory, it exercises certain governance and representation functions for its community under the Aboriginal Land Grant (Jervis Bay Territory) Act 1986 

Administration 

The Jervis Bay Territory is administered by the federal Department of Infrastructure, Regional Development and Cities. However, it is counted as part of the ACT for the purpose of the ACT's representation in the Senate; it forms part of the Division of Fenner for House of Representatives purposes.

For most purposes, the territory is governed under the laws of the Australian Capital Territory, by the Jervis Bay Administration, which handles matters normally concerned with local or state government. It also provides primary school teachers and Australian Federal Police staffing. Residents have access to the courts of the ACT, but are not separately represented in the ACT Legislative Assembly. Although they are subject to ACT law and some services are contracted by the Australian Government to nearby (New South Wales) councils, Jervis Bay Territory residents have no voting rights at ACT Assembly or NSW local elections. They do however have access to the decision-making process through community organisations. Further, Aboriginal persons who are registered members of the Wreck Bay Aboriginal Community Council have voting rights both at meetings of the Wreck Bay Aboriginal Community Council, and to elect the executive of that Council.

Section 61 of the Defence Force Discipline Act (DFDA) makes all Australian Defence Force members and "Defence Civilians" subject to the criminal laws of the Jervis Bay Territory regardless of where the offence occurred. This is a legal mechanism that makes Defence personnel subject to the Crimes Act 1914 (Cth), the Criminal Code Act 1995 (Cth) and offences against the criminal law of the ACT, as military law, even if the offence is committed elsewhere outside Australia.

The Commonwealth contracts the ACT government to provide various services like courts, education and welfare, the Government of New South Wales for rural fire services and community health, Shoalhaven City Council for waste collection and library services, and commercial providers for electricity and water supplies.

Geography 

Having  of land and  marine reserve, Jervis Bay Territory is the smallest of all the mainland states and territories of Australia. The majority of Jervis Bay embayment is part of Jervis Bay Marine Park (NSW State) but the waters within JB Territory are part of Booderee National Park (Commonwealth). Booderee National Park was formerly known as Jervis Bay National Park (Commonwealth).

A wide variety of flora and fauna are native to the Booderee (Aboriginal: bay of plenty) National Park with approximately 206 species of birds, 27 species of mammals, 15 species of amphibians, 23 species of reptiles and 180 species of fish native to the area. The park itself encompasses approximately 90% of the territory of Jervis Bay and covers the overlap between Australia's northern and southern climatic zones. Ancient sand dunes overlay the sedimentary bedrock formations formed from upheaval of the surrounding marine environment 280–225 million years ago. 

It has rookeries for the little penguin Eudyptula minor.

Villages 

There are two villages in the Jervis Bay Territory. They are both covered by postcode 2540. Listed from north to south, they are:

 Jervis Bay Village (pop. 189)
 Wreck Bay Village (pop. 152)

There are four private leasehold properties in the Jervis Bay Territory, within but not part of Booderee National Park.

Among these leasehold properties is the historical, heritage-listed Christian's Minde settlement, which was founded in 1880 by the Ellmoos family from Denmark. Christian's Minde was the first guesthouse on the NSW south coast between Port Hacking and Twofold Bay. The properties Christian's Minde, Kullindi and Ellmoos have been consistently inhabited and looked after by descendants and relatives of the first settlers. Many members of the family are buried in a cemetery on a hill, surrounded by dense bush near the settlement.

HMAS Creswell 

Within the Booderee National Park is HMAS Creswell, the Royal Australian Navy College named after Sir William Rooke Creswell, the Director of the Commonwealth Naval Forces which later became the RAN. The Jervis Bay Airfield is adjacent, operated by the RAN to support its BAE Systems Kalkara (Storm Petrel) pilotless target aircraft. Kalkaras are launched from the airfield and later recovered by parachute into the water and thence by boats maintained at HMAS Creswell, after target-towing exercises off the coast with ships or aircraft. Control equipment is sited at Bherwerre Ridge overlooking the sea to the east.

Proposed reactor site 

The territory was once the proposed location for a nuclear power plant. The project, which was to be on the south east corner of the Bay near Murray's Beach, was cancelled in 1971. This was after preparatory excavation and levelling had been done and an access road constructed between the site and the territory border. The levelled area is now the car park for Murray's Beach and its adjacent boat ramp.

See also 
 
 
 South Coast Pipe

References

External links 

 
 Jervis Bay Territory Governance and Administration
 Jervis Bay – VisitNSW.com

 
Enclaves and exclaves
City of Shoalhaven
South Coast (New South Wales)
States and territories established in 1915
1915 establishments in Australia